Ypsolopha aleutianella is a moth of the family Ypsolophidae. It is known from the Aleutian Islands.

References

Ypsolophidae
Moths of North America